Route 465 was a short highway in southern Missouri. It followed Ozark Mountain Highroad northwest of Branson. The southern terminus was at Route 76, while the  northern terminus was at U.S. Route 65 north of Branson. There were plans to eventually reconnect the route to US 65.

Route description
Route 465 began at an interchange with Route 76 northwest of Branson in Stone County. A stub of the freeway with ghost ramps continues a short distance south of the interchange. From the junction with Route 76, the four-lane freeway headed north through wooded hilly areas, curving to the northeast. The median widened and the road entered Taney County before heading to the north again. The route turned to the east, the median narrowing before an interchange with Route 248. Past this interchange, the highway continued east through more rural areas. The freeway ended as the road came to an at-grade intersection with Adair Road. Route 465 went east as a four-lane undivided road for a short distance before ending at an interchange with US 65, where Route 76 now leaves the Highroad to run concurrently along US 65 to downtown Branson. The road continues past US 65 as Route F.

History
Route 465 opened to traffic in June 2003. There were plans to extend Ozark Mountain Road back to US 65. Missouri Depart of Transportation (MoDot) owns the right of way for the unbuilt portion. As of 2021 there are no plans to extend the highway.

In order for the city of Branson to obtain the "strip" of Branson between Route 376 and US 65, Route 76 was routed on to the Highroad and US 65 between the Highroad and 76 Country Boulevard. As Route 76 was re-aligned on to the entirety of the highroad, Route 465 was decommissioned. Work to replace the old signage started on January 6, 2020, and was projected to end in March 2020. Former Route 76 between the now city-maintained part of 76 Country Boulevard and the Highroad became part of Route 376.

Major intersections
All exits were unnumbered.

References

External links
Highways and Gas Stations - Mo. Hwy. 465 Page
MoDOT Tackles Tough Terrain on Ozark Highroad Job

465
Transportation in Stone County, Missouri
Transportation in Taney County, Missouri